Admiral Francis Egerton (15 September 1824 – 15 December 1895), known as Francis Leveson-Gower until 1833, was a British naval commander and politician from the Egerton family.

Early life
Egerton was the second son of eleven children born to Harriet Catherine Greville, Countess of Ellesmere, and Francis Egerton, 1st Earl of Ellesmere, who served as Secretary at War and Chief Secretary for Ireland.  His father inherited the considerable wealth (but not the titles) of Francis Egerton, 3rd Duke of Bridgewater.

His mother, a great-great-granddaughter of the 5th Baron Brooke, was the daughter of Charles Greville, and his paternal grandparents were George Leveson-Gower, 1st Duke of Sutherland and Elizabeth Leveson-Gower, Duchess of Sutherland (daughter of the 18th Earl of Sutherland). His maternal uncle was the private secretary to the Duke of Wellington.

Career
In 1840, he joined the Royal Navy and immediately saw active service due to the Oriental Crisis of that year: he served off the Syrian coast and was present at the bombardment of Acre.

He was aide-de-camp to Queen Victoria from 1865 to 1873. In 1873, he was promoted to Rear admiral, and he was placed on the retired list in November 1875. Following his retirement, he continued to be promoted: in 1878 to Vice-admiral and in 1884 to the rank of Admiral.

He also sat as Member of Parliament for Derbyshire East from 1868 to 1885 and for Derbyshire North-East from 1885 to 1886.

In his later years he was a resident of Surrey, where he continued his political activities as president of the Chertsey Division of the Central Liberal Council. He was appointed Lord Lieutenant of the county in 1893.

Personal life
Egerton married Lady Louisa Caroline Cavendish (1835–1907), daughter of William Cavendish, 7th Duke of Devonshire, and sister of Spencer Cavendish, 8th Duke of Devonshire, in 1861. Together, Francis and Lady Louisa were the parents of:

 William Francis Egerton (1868–1949), who married Lady Alice Osborne, a daughter of George Osborne, 9th Duke of Leeds
 Commander Frederick Greville Egerton (1869–1899), who died at Ladysmith in South Africa, from wounds received in action.
 Blanche Harriet Egerton (1871–1943), who was born in London.
 Dorothy Charlotte Egerton (1874–1959), who was appointed Officer, Order of the British Empire.
 Christian Mary Egerton (1876–1970), who was appointed Member, Order of the British Empire.

He died on 15 December 1895 at his home in Weybridge from heart disease aged 71 and was buried at Byfleet.

Descendants
Through his son Francis, he was a grandfather of Captain Francis Egerton (1896–1935), who married the Hon. Doris Mary Pottinger Meysey-Thompson, a daughter of Henry Meysey-Thompson, 1st Baron Knaresborough and Ethel Adeline Pottinger (daughter of Sir Henry Pottinger, 3rd Baronet).  Among her siblings was Helen Winifred, Lady Newton, the mother of Peter Richard Legh, 4th Baron Newton; Violet Ethel Meysey-Thompson, the mother of Giles Vandeleur and wife of Sir Algar Howard.

References

External links

External links 
 

1824 births
1895 deaths
Younger sons of earls
Members of the Parliament of the United Kingdom for constituencies in Derbyshire
Lord-Lieutenants of Surrey
UK MPs 1868–1874
UK MPs 1874–1880
UK MPs 1880–1885
UK MPs 1885–1886
Francis
Francis
Royal Navy admirals
Liberal Party (UK) MPs for English constituencies